Daniel Guthrie Morrison (born January 21, 1948) is a former professional baseball umpire who worked in the American League from 1979 to 1999, and throughout both major leagues in 2000 and 2001. He wore uniform number 34 when the AL adopted them for its umpires in 1980 and retained the number when the AL and NL umpiring staffs merged in 2000. Morrison umpired 2,660 major league games in his 23-year career. He umpired in the 1992 World Series, the 1988 Major League Baseball All-Star Game, three American League Championship Series (1989, 1996 and 1999), and three Division Series (1995, 1997, and 2000).

Career
Morrison was a minor league umpire in 1979 during the major league umpire strike. He turned down an offer for a major league position during the strike. This earned Morrison respect among major league umpires. Later that season, he ended up in the major leagues anyway; Lou DiMuro was injured and Morrison was called up as his replacement.

See also 

 List of Major League Baseball umpires

References

External links
The Sporting News umpire card

1948 births
Living people
Major League Baseball umpires
People from Glasgow, Kentucky
Sportspeople from Kentucky